Birmingham South refers to two electoral divisions for the city of Birmingham, UK:

 Birmingham South (UK Parliament constituency) (1885–1918)
 Birmingham South (European Parliament constituency) (1979–1984)